Wayne and Shuster were a Canadian comedy duo formed by Johnny Wayne and Frank Shuster. They were active professionally from the early 1940s until the late 1980s, first as a live act, then on radio, then as part of The Army Show that entertained troops in Europe during World War II, and then on both Canadian and American television.

Wayne (born Louis Weingarten; May 28, 1918 – July 18, 1990) and Shuster (September 5, 1916 – January 13, 2002) were well known in Canada, and were Ed Sullivan's most frequently recurring guests, appearing a record 67 times on his show. Despite repeated suggestions that they should move to the United States to further their careers, the duo chose to stay in Canada.

Beginnings
Wayne and Shuster were born in the same neighbourhood in Toronto, Ontario, Canada, and met in grade school. In 1931, while students at Harbord Collegiate Institute, they performed their first skit together for their Boy Scout troop, and, as part of the school drama club, continued to entertain fellow students. They both studied at the University of Toronto, where they wrote and performed as "Shuster and Wayne".

Radio

In 1941, they made their radio debut on CFRB in their own show, The Javex Wife Preservers, for which they were each paid $12.50 per week to dispense household hints in a humorous fashion.  Their popularity on CFRB, at the time a top-rated Toronto radio station, soon landed the pair on the Canadian Broadcasting Corporation's (CBC) Trans-Canada Network as part of the Buckingham Cigarette "Blended Rhythm Show".

They enlisted in the Canadian Army in 1942, and were immediately assigned to The Canadian Army Radio Show, which was produced in Montreal. Shuster and Wayne wrote most of the music, lyrics and skits, and were part of a cast that featured the singers Jimmie Shields and Raymonde Maranda. The radio show was a success, resulting in The Army Show, a touring stage version that opened in Toronto in April 1943 to popular acclaim. Time Magazine called it "a high-spirited, always likeable, often lavish soldier show... Two Toronto sergeants, 26-year-old Frank Shuster and 24-year-old Johnny Wayne, had authored a peppy book, some perky tunes and lyrics."  The revue travelled across Canada in 1943 to entertain troops and help with the sale of Victory Bonds, and included a stop at the Quebec Conference. In addition to Shuster and Wayne, the cast included the singer Roger Doucet, Brian and Dennis Farnon, Denny Vaughan, and Lois Hooker (who later, as Lois Maxwell, starred as Miss Moneypenny in fourteen James Bond films). In late 1943, the revue was split up into five units and sent to England to entertain troops. Shuster and Wayne again prepared most of the material for all the units, and were assigned to a unit that followed Canadian troops into France following D-Day. The duo often performed close enough to the front lines that they had to contend with snipers, strafing and even a relatively close encounter with an exploding V-1 "buzz bomb".

After demobilization, Shuster and Wayne returned to Toronto and started The RCA Victor Show on CBC Radio. An advertising executive suggested that "Wayne & Shuster" sounded better than "Shuster & Wayne". Since the order of their names wasn't important to the two, they agreed to the change. (Alex Barris later recalled that they had a CBC office with two doors — one read "Wayne & Shuster", the other was "Shuster & Wayne".) Their popularity rapidly grew and CBC changed the name of their radio programme to The Wayne & Shuster Show. By 1950, their Canadian weekly audience numbered 3 million. They also began to make a name for themselves in the U.S. when they were hired to make a radio network series to replace William Bendix's The Life of Riley while it was on summer hiatus in 1947.

Television
Wayne & Shuster first appeared on television in 1950, but not in Canada, which did not have network TV until 1952. Their radio sponsor, Toni Home Permanent, also sponsored an American television show, Toni Twin Time, hosted by Jack Lemmon. The sponsor asked the duo to make regular appearances on the TV program, which was not doing well. After two shows, a sponsor executive asked them to take over the hosting duties from Lemmon, who was young, inexperienced, and obviously nervous. However, they were unsure about this new medium of television, and turned down the offer.

In 1952, CBC producer Mavor Moore approached them about doing a regular live comedy show on the new CBC Television network, but after watching Milton Berle dealing with all of the details of lighting, sound, music and audience while broadcasting live from New York City, the two were even more concerned about the demands of live television. They agreed to make an appearance in one CBC television show in 1952 in Montreal, but turned down the opportunity to produce a regular show in Toronto. Wayne said, "You guys don't know anything about television. We don't either. Why don't we wait until we both know something about it?"

Two years later, in 1954, they finally agreed to host a regular comedy show on CBC. In 1955, on one of their shows, they presented a Shakespearean spoof called "Rinse the Blood Off My Toga", which they also presented on British television the same year. A literary mashup of William Shakespeare and Mickey Spillane, the sketch features a hard-boiled Roman private eye hired by Brutus to investigate the murder of Julius Caesar on the Ides of March. As with many of their scripts, "Rinse the Blood Off My Toga" assumed the audience had a working knowledge of history, Shakespeare, and sometimes even Latin. In 1958, in response to the opening of the Stratford Festival in Stratford, Ontario, they created "A Shakespearean Baseball Game", written in iambic pentameter and rhyming couplets, and featuring lines lifted from Hamlet and Macbeth. ("O, what a rogue and bush league slob am I!... O, curséd fate, that I, who led the league, should bat .208.") In later years, they considered this their favourite script.

Lorraine Thomson, who often appeared on their live broadcasts in the 1950s, called their writing "a kind of cross between a more erudite British sense of humour and the more American vaudevillian sense of humour. They treated their audiences with respect."

In 1958, they signed a one-year contract with Ed Sullivan to appear regularly on The Ed Sullivan Show for $7,500 a show; that included a handshake agreement that Sullivan would not cut or edit their sketches, which tended to run 12 minutes or longer; their first sketch was a 14-minute re-run of the sketch they had done for CBC and British television, "Rinse the Blood Off My Toga". (Singer Eartha Kitt once asked Frank Shuster, "What have you got on Ed Sullivan?" after Sullivan cut one of her songs from a program, but left Wayne & Shuster's 12-minute sketch intact.) The only time Sullivan asked for an edit was in order to remove a joke about Southern lynchings; he was worried about offending network stations in the Southern U.S. Sullivan loved the Canadian duo and renewed their contract repeatedly; they appeared on The Ed Sullivan Show a record 67 times over the next 11 years. Frank Shuster later disputed this, telling TV critic Jim Bawden that "We were on Ed 58 times. The record books say 67, but that's wrong."

Ed Sullivan advised the two, despite their success in the U.S., to remain in Toronto. They took his advice and turned down many offers to move to the United States permanently. In later years, Shuster often told the story of one agent who tried to get them to move to Hollywood, insisting, "You know, Frank, there's more to life than happiness."

Regardless of their home address, in 1962, and again in 1963, they were ranked as the best comedy routine in America by Motion Picture Daily and Television Today, and co-starred in a CBS-TV sitcom, Holiday Lodge, which aired as a summer replacement for [and was produced by] Jack Benny in 1961.

In 1964, Wayne & Shuster created a series of six short documentaries for CBC Television (later presented on CBS during the 1966 summer season) about comedians such as W. C. Fields and the Marx Brothers, with music scored by John Williams, titled Wayne & Shuster Take an Affectionate Look at.... They made another six episodes the following year. In 1965 The Wayne & Shuster Hour won the Silver Rose at the Rose d'Or Television Festival.

In 1962 and again in 1965, the pair went to Britain and produced Wayne & Shuster specials for the BBC.

In the 1960s, they moved from a weekly television show to monthly Wayne & Shuster comedy specials on CBC Television. By the 1970s, they were producing three to four comedy specials per year, which often drew Canadian television ratings of more than two million viewers.

Wayne and Shuster's skits often employed large casts of characters, and supporting players included Canadian actors Don Cullen, Jack Duffy, Tom Harvey, Bill Kemp, Paul Kligman, Ben Lennick, Sylvia Lennick, Pegi Loder, Les Rubie, Eric Christmas, Joe Austin, Larry Mann, Paul Soles, Marilyn Stuart, Roy Wordsworth, John Davies, Carol Robinson, Lou Pitoscia, Peggy Mahon, Don Ewer, Howard Swinson and Keith Hampshire. For many years, their music director was Canadian jazz artist Norman Amadio.

Wayne and Shuster were infamous for their vociferous arguments during scriptwriting sessions, television production and editing sessions. Wayne especially was particularly exacting during production and often took the studio crew to task for perceived faults. The technicians often responded by refusing to work overtime at the end of the day. During one sketch, some crew members were instructed to throw fruit and vegetables at both of the comedians from off-camera. Instead, the crew only hurled fruit at Wayne. One floor director remembered Wayne as "two people. On the [studio] floor he was a son of a bitch, but outside he was one of the nicest guys you could meet." Despite their temperamental reputation in the studio, both were friendly, thoughtful and welcoming outside of work.

Because of their combative natures in the studio, the two agreed early on to not mix socially. Shortly after their CBC radio show became popular, Wayne told Shuster that he was organizing a party, but that he wasn't going to invite his partner "because we're always together and we'll start in about the business. So, to hell with that." Shuster agreed, and from that point on, they led completely separate lives away from work, with different interests and hobbies.

Later career
By the late 1970s, critics were calling their comedy irrelevant and out of date, but their Canadian TV ratings remained strong. In 1980, CBC re-packaged their material into 80 half-hour specials that were syndicated worldwide.

The pair continued to produce comedy specials until Wayne's death from cancer in 1990. After Wayne's death, Shuster went back into the editing suite and from almost 40 years of their television shows, produced a retrospective series of twenty-two shows, which he also hosted. In 1999, three years before his death, he hosted a one-hour compendium of their work, "Wayne & Shuster: The First Hundred Years".

Awards 

After Wayne's death in 1990, the duo received a special Gemini Award for their outstanding contribution to Canadian television.
In 1996, Shuster accepted the Margaret Collier Award for the duo's comedy writing
In 1996, Shuster was named an officer of the Order of Canada.
In 1999, Wayne and Shuster were inducted into Canada's Walk of Fame.
In 2012, the duo were recognized with a Heritage Toronto plaque at their old high school, Harbord Collegiate Institute.
In 2019, a lane in the Bathurst/Harbord area where they grew up was named Wayne and Shuster Lane.

Other media
In 2000, Australian music group The Avalanches created a track called "Frontier Psychiatrist", which was built on various samples of previously recorded material, most noticeably the Wayne & Shuster sketch "Frontier Psychiatrist". (Audio clips of two other Wayne and Shuster sketches were also used in creating the track, along with samples of dozens of pieces of music.) "Frontier Psychiatrist" was released as a single, and became a hit in the UK, reaching No. 18 on the charts. Johnny Wayne vocalizes the song's repeated refrain "that boy needs therapy"; both Wayne and Frank Shuster are the featured voices throughout verses one and two.

References

External links

 
 
 Wayne and Shuster Museum of Broadcast Communications biography
 Wayne and Shuster Tribute A tribute to Johnny Wayne and Frank Shuster
 The Shakespearian Baseball Game. 1958 Text and Video.
 Wayne and Shuster Radio Show including the sketches "Shakespearean Baseball", "I Was a T.V. Addict", "Rinse the Blood Off My Toga", and "Frontier Psychiatrist".
 "Rinse the Blood Off My Toga" sketch on YouTube
 Wayne and Shuster at The Canadian Encyclopedia
  Johnny Wayne
  Frank Shuster
  Wayne and Shuster

1952 Canadian television series debuts
1990 Canadian television series endings
1950s Canadian sketch comedy television series
1960s Canadian sketch comedy television series
1970s Canadian sketch comedy television series
1980s Canadian sketch comedy television series
Black-and-white Canadian television shows
CBC Television original programming
Canadian radio sketch shows
Canadian comedy duos
Jewish Canadian culture
Jewish comedy and humor
Canadian Comedy Award winners